Khem Karan is a town and a nagar panchayat in Tarn Taran district of Patti tehsil of the Majha region of the Indian state of Punjab. 

It was the site of a tank battle in 1965. The Battle of Asal Uttar was the second largest tank battle of the 1965 Indo-Pakistani War. The battle led to the creation of Patton Nagar (or Patton City/Graveyard) at the site of the battle viz, Khem Karan.

History
Khem Karan is an old town. It was visited by Guru Tegh Bahadur (1621–1675). Previously in Lahore District before the partition of British India. It became a part of Amritsar District afterwards. 

Many of the town's residents migrated from nearby villages between 1947 and 1965, such as Nathuwala, Qadiwind, Rohiwal, and Sehjra. The town's Muslim residents migrated primarily to the city of Kasur, 8 km away in Pakistan.

The town used to be accessible to the city of Kasur, Pakistan 8 km away, and to Ferozepur 35 km away until India and Pakistan enacted border controls in 1953 and further restricted travel in 1965. The residents of Khem Karan were essentially cut off from both towns - Kasur lies in Pakistan, while the road to Ferozepur cuts through Pakistan, creating a 70 kilometre detour.

India-Pakistan war of 1965
The tank battles of 1965 form part of military history as the most intense armored battles between World War II and the 1991 Gulf War. Close to four hundred tanks on both sides took part in the pitched battles and offensives. Initially Indian strength was limited to one armored division and one independent armoured brigade, along with six armoured regiments supporting infantry divisions. Pakistan had two armored divisions, with then modern M-48 Patton tanks. India had an equivalent tank in the Centurion, but their strength was limited to four armored regiments.

Demographics
 India census, Khem Karan had a population of 13,446. Males constituted 55% and females 45%. Khem Karan has an average literacy rate of 61.55%, lower than the state average of 75.84%: male literacy is 67%, and female literacy is 54.85%. In Khem Karan, 12.14% of the population is under 6 years of age.

Geography 
It is located 56km from Tarn Taran Sahib. It is in Tarn Taran district.

Politics 
The city is part of the Khemkaran South Assembly Constituency.

Tourism
In this village is the mausoleum (mazaar) of Sufi saint known as Pir Baba Sheikh Brahm. Twice in a year a mela is held there.

Economy 
Khemkaran is mostly an agricultural village.

Notable people 

 Deepak Dhawan

References

Battles of Indo-Pakistani wars
Indo-Pakistani War of 1965
Cities and towns in Tarn Taran district